Jatra is a 2006 Indian Marathi-language comedy film directed and written by Kedar Shinde. The music was composed by the duo Ajay–Atul, and features the song Kombadi Palali, the melody of which was re-released as "Chikni Chameli" for the Hindi film Agneepath in 2012, as well as the song '"Ye Maina", which was re-used as "Mera Naam Mary Hai" for the Hindi film Brothers, both of which were directed by Karan Malhotra.

Plot
The story is primarily about two villages called Hyalagaad and Tyaalagaad. The name of the villages roughly translate to "bury them". The focus of the film is about the towns' attempt celebrate Jatra or religious fair. The hosting of the fair leads to a rivalry between the two villages. To determine whether Hyalagaad or Tyaalagaad hosts the fair, the towns' decide to hold a race between two individuals (Monya and Siddhu), who are willing to run, cheat and even kill for winning the rights to host the festival.

A youth called Monya played by Bharat Jadhav, who wants to become rich along with his six friends by unsavory means, arrives in the village. At the same time, his look alike who has a limited vocabulary also arrives in the same village. What follows is a comedy of errors, one liners and slapstick.

Cast
 Bharat Jadhav as Monya/Ghumya Double Role
 Siddhartha Jadhav as Siddhu
 Kranti Redkar as Shevanta 
 Vijay Chavan as Jiva Kanole/ Shiva Kanole Double Role
 Priya Berde as Akka
Kushal Badrike as Monya's friend 
 Sanjay Khapre as Sanjya
 Upendra Limaye as Ramdas Mali
 Viju Khote as DCP Madhav Sakhardande

Music

Kombadi Palali
"Kombadi Palali" is an item number from the film. The song features Bharat Jadhav, along with Kranti Readkar, and was sung by Anand Shinde and Vaishali Samant, with music by Ajay–Atul. Jitendra Joshi wrote the lyrics to the song. Shreya Ghoshal sang Chikni Chameli in Agneepath and it features Katrina Kaif.

Reception
In his review of the film, Pradip Patil of Marathi Movie World considered that: ..."Kedar has pulled all the tricks to esure that viewers remains engaged. The events take place at such a fast pace that you hardly get time to think at all. The dialogues are another plus point of this film. One must give the credits to all the actors who have given such energetic performances. The movie belongs to Bharat Jadhav, Vijay Chavan and Siddharth Jadahv."

Trivia
 At the start of the film, Raj Thackeray provides the voice over as he introduces the story that unfolds.
 Priyadarshan Jadhav wrote the lyrics for the song "Ye go ye Maina".
 The tune from the song "Kombdi Palali" was later used by Ajay and Atul when composing the item song "Chikni Chameli" for the Hindi film Agneepath in 2012 
 The tune from the song "Ye Go Ye Ye Maina" was later used by Ajay and Atul in composing the item song "Mera Naam Mary Hai" for the Hindi film Brothers in 2015.

References

External links

2006 films
Indian comedy films
2006 comedy films
2000s Marathi-language films
Films scored by Ajay–Atul